Livia Giampalmo (born 14 October 1941) is an Italian actress, voice actress, film director and screenwriter.

Biography
Born in Genoa, Giampalmo began her career on television in 1965 and in 1972, she made her acting debut in the film The Seduction of Mimi directed by Lina Wertmüller, yet she has mostly been active as a screenwriter and director. She most notably directed the 2004 film Stay with Me which starred her son Adriano Giannini. She has also served as a screenwriter for the 1988 film The Gamble.

Giampalmo has also served as a voice actress. She has dubbed Diane Keaton and Jane Fonda in a select few of their films as well as Goldie Hawn, Anne Bancroft, Kathleen Turner and Shelley Winters. She notably dubbed Shelley Duvall in The Shining and Sigourney Weaver in Ghostbusters.

Personal life
From 1967 until 1975, Giampalmo was married to actor Giancarlo Giannini. They had two children including actor Adriano Giannini. Their eldest son Lorenzo died from an aneurysm in 1988. She has also dated actor Gino Lavagetto.

Filmography

Cinema

As actor
The Seduction of Mimi (1972)

As director and screenwriter
Due volte vent'anni (1987)
Evelina e i suoi figli (1990)
My Daughter‘s Father (1997)
Stay with Me (2004)

Dubbing roles

Animation
Sally Brown in Snoopy Come Home
Girl in ChalkZone

Live action
Wendy Torrance in The Shining
Dana Barrett in Ghostbusters
Luna Schlosser in Sleeper
Mary Wilkie in Manhattan
Sonja in Love and Death
Annie Hall in Annie Hall
Theresa Dunn in Looking for Mr. Goodbar
Renata in Interiors
Louise Bryant in Reds
Faith Dunlap in Shoot the Moon
Chelsea Thayer Wayne in On Golden Pond
Alex Sternbergen in The Morning After
Lillian Hellman in Julia
Hannah Warren in California Suite
Lee Winters in Rollover
Ellen Gordon in Any Wednesday
Toni Simmons in Cactus Flower
Judy Benjamin in Private Benjamin
Lou Jean Poplin in The Sugarland Express
Consuella in Zardoz
Dorrie in Stardust Memories
Anna Bronski in To Be or Not to Be
Joan Wilder in Romancing the Stone
Joan Wilder in The Jewel of the Nile
Peggy Ann Snow in Magic
Valeria in Conan the Barbarian
Queen Taramis in Conan the Destroyer
Inga in Young Frankenstein
Carla Moran in The Entity
Rosa Amici in Earthquake
Maria Elena in The Life and Times of Judge Roy Bean
Kay Kirby in When Time Ran Out
Anne Kimbrough in Piranha II: The Spawning
Maggie Whelan in The Concorde ... Airport '79
Mary Lewis in 10

References

External links

1941 births
Living people
Actors from Genoa
Film people from Genoa
Italian film actresses
Italian television actresses
Italian voice actresses
Italian women film directors
Italian women screenwriters
20th-century Italian actresses
21st-century Italian actresses